Bagh Ali-ye Olya (also Romanized as Bāgh ‘Alī-ye ‘Olyā and Bāgh-e ‘Alī-ye ‘Olyā; also known as Bāgh ‘Alī-ye Bālā) is a village in Zhan Rural District, in the Central District of Dorud County, Lorestan Province, Iran. At the 2006 census, its population was 52, in 11 families.

References 

Towns and villages in Dorud County